Associazione Calcio Formigine Associazione Sportiva Dilettantistica is an Italian football club based in Formigine, Emilia Romagna. Currently it plays in Italy's Eccellenza Emilia-Romagna/A.

History

Foundation
The club was founded in 1968.

Serie D
In the season 2011–12 the team was promoted for the first time, from Eccellenza Emilia-Romagna/B to Serie D/D.

Colours and badge
The team's colors are green and blue.

Players

First team

Youth

Honours
Eccellenza Emilia-Romagna/B: 2011–12

References

External links
Official website 

Football clubs in Italy
Association football clubs established in 1968
Football clubs in Emilia-Romagna
1968 establishments in Italy